Events in the year 2011 in Russia.

Incumbents
 President of Russia – Dmitry Medvedev (United Russia)
 Prime Minister of Russia – Vladimir Putin (United Russia)

Events

 January 1 - Kolavia Flight 348: Four people are killed and around 40 injured after a passenger plane explodes in Surgut in eastern Russia.
 January 22 - At least two people are killed in a blaze at a shopping centre in the southwest Russian city of Ufa.
 January 24 - 2011 Domodedovo International Airport bombing: At least 35 people are killed and 130 injured after a suicide bombing at Domodedovo International Airport in the Russian capital Moscow.
 January 26 - Russian President Dmitry Medvedev fires top airport security officials, two days after the suicide bombing at Moscow's Domodedovo International Airport.
 February 9 - Serial blasts rock Russia's Grozny, at least five people are wounded.
 February 28 - Rosatom, the Russian state nuclear energy corporation, explains that the Bushehr Nuclear Power Plant has been delayed in opening due to damage to the nuclear reactor's cooling pumps.
 March 1 - As part of the Russian police reform, the Russian law enforcers' name was changed from "Militsiya" (militia) to "Politsiya" (police).
 March 27 - Russia switching to permanent daylight saving time (DST) under a decree President Dmitry Medvedev signed a month earlier.
 May 2 - The UN Security Council fails to agree a statement to condemn the killing of Syrian protesters, as Russia and China block a statement proposed by Britain, France, Germany and Portugal that would have condemned the violence, which has led to hundreds of dead, and backed calls for an independent investigation.
 May 4 - Russian security forces kill Doger Sevdet, an al-Qaeda emissary who  fought alongside Chechen insurgents, in the northern Caucasus region of Russia.
 May 6 - Russia launches an urgent rescue mission after the nuclear-powered icebreaker Taymyr in its fleet develops a nuclear leak in the frozen seas of the Arctic and was forced to abandon its mission.
 May 6 - A court in Russia sentences ultranationalist Nikita Tikhonov to life imprisonment for the murder of human rights lawyer Stanislav Markelov and journalist Anastasia Baburova in 2009.
 May 19 - The Eurasian Economic Community, led by Russia, offers Belarus a $3 billion bailout package.
 May 30 - Documents discovered in a Russian archive suggest that Adolf Hitler ordered Rudolf Hess to go to the United Kingdom to negotiate with Winston Churchill over a World War II peace deal in 1941.
 June 2 - 42 people are injured and 13,000 people evacuated from settlements in Russia's Udmurt Republic following an ammo depot fire.
 June 3 - 57 people are injured, and 28,000 people have been forced to evacuate, following an explosion at an army munitions depot in Russia's western Ural Mountains region.
 July 20 - Beer is legally reclassified from a foodstuff to an alcoholic drink so that its sale will be more strongly controlled.
 September 7 - 2011 Lokomotiv Yaroslavl plane crash: A Yak Service Yak-42 carrying the KHL hockey team Lokomotiv Yaroslavl crashes near Yaroslavl, Russia, killing 44.

Popular culture

Sports
 January 5 - Russia men's national junior ice hockey team won the 2011 World Junior Ice Hockey Championships.
 May - The Russian professional basketball team UNICS Kazan wins the Eurocup Basketball competition.

Births

Notable deaths

January

 January 1 -
 Nikolay Abramov, 26, Russian footballer.
 George Alexandrovich Ball, 83, Russian writer.
 January 4 - Chrysanth Chepil, 73, Russian Orthodox prelate, Metropolitan of Vyatka-Slobodskoy.
 January 6 - Pyotr Sumin, 64, Russian politician, Governor of Chelyabinsk Oblast (1996–2010).
 January 31 - Nikolay Dorizo, 87, Russian poet.

February

 February 3 - Tatyana Shmyga, 82, Russian operetta singer and film actress (Hussar Ballad), People's Artist of the USSR, vascular disease.
 February 24 - Sergei Nikitich Kovalev, 91, Russian designer of nuclear submarines.
 February 25 - Valery Bezruchenko, 70, Russian clarinetist and music teacher.

March

 March 4 - Mikhail Simonov, 81, Russian aircraft designer, chief designer of the Sukhoi Design Bureau (1983–2011), after long illness.
 March 13 - Vitaly Vulf, 80, Russian theater critic and television host.
 March 14 - Eduard Gushchin, 70, Russian Olympic bronze medal-winning (1968) athlete.
 March 21 - Nikolai Andrianov, 58, Russian gymnast, most medaled athlete at the 1976 Summer Olympics, after long illness.
 March 25 - Pavel Leonov, 90, Russian naïve artist.
 March 26 - Alexander Barykin, 59, Russian musician, heart attack.
 March 30 - Lyudmila Gurchenko, 75, Russian film actress and singer, People's Artist of the USSR.
 March 31 - Vassili Kononov, 88, Russian military veteran and war criminal.

April

 April 1 - George Gryaznov, 77, Russian Orthodox Archbishop of Chelyabinsk and Zlatoust (1989–1996), stroke.
 April 3 - Yevgeny Lyadin, 84, Russian footballer.
 April 6 - Igor Birman, 85, Russian-born American writer and economist.
 April 10 - Mikhail Rusyayev, 46, Russian footballer.
 April 27 - Igor Kon, 82, Russian philosopher, psychologist and sexologist.
 April 28 - Yulia Rumyantseva, 42, Russian editor and film producer, suicide by jumping.
 April 29 - Vladimir Krainev, 67, Russian pianist, People's Artist of the USSR, aortic aneurysm.

May

 May 2 - 
 Alexander Lazarev, 73, Russian actor.
 Leonid Abalkin, 80, Russian economist.
 May 8 - Galina Urbanovich, 93, Russian Olympic gold and silver medal-winning (1952) gymnast.
 May 19 - Vladimir Ryzhkin, 80, Russian Olympic gold medal-winning (1956) footballer.
 May 22 - Nina Yablonskaya, 46, Russian businesswoman and beauty salon director.

June

 June 7 - Maksud Sadikov, 48, Russian Islamic scholar and theologian, shot.
 June 10 - Yuri Budanov, 47, Russian military officer and war criminal, shot.
 June 15 - Pavel Stolbov, 81, Russian gymnast, 1956 Olympic gold medalist.
 June 18 - Yelena Bonner, 88, Russian human rights activist, after long illness.
 June 20 - 
 Magomet Isayev, 83, Russian Esperantist, translator and linguist.
 Vladimir Pettay, 38, Russian football referee, plane crash.
 June 23 - Vladislav Achalov, 65, Russian general and activist.

July

 July 7 - Yuri Kukin, 78, Russian singer-songwriter.
 July 14 - Vladimir Kosinsky, 66, Russian swimmer, 1968 Olympic silver and bronze medalist.
 July 19 - Karen Khachaturian, 90, Russian composer.
 July 21 - Yevgeny Lopatin, 93, Russian Olympic silver medal-winning (1952) weightlifter.
 July 22 - Dmitri Furman, 68, Russian historian and philosopher, after long illness.
 July 27 - Eduard Rozovsky, 84, Russian cinematographer (Amphibian Man, White Sun of the Desert), car accident.

August

 August 2 - 
 Asadullo Gulomov, 58, Tajik politician, Deputy Prime Minister (since 2006).
 Andrey Kapitsa, 80, Russian geographer and explorer, discovered and named Lake Vostok.
 August 3 - Nikolai Arnoldovich Petrov, 68, Russian pianist.
 August 14 - Yekaterina Golubeva, 44, Russian actress.
 August 27 - Iya Savvina, 75, Russian actress, People's Artist of the USSR.
 August 30 - Alla Bayanova, 97, Russian singer, People's Artist of Russia, cancer.
 August 31 - Valery Rozhdestvensky, 72, Soviet cosmonaut.

September

 September 29 -
 Tatyana Lioznova, 87, Russian film director (Seventeen Moments of Spring), People's Artist of the USSR.
 Vera Popkova, 68, Russian athlete, Olympic bronze medalist (1968).

December

 December 24 - Vitaly Tseshkovsky, 67,  Russian chess Grandmaster.

See also
List of Russian films of 2011

References

 
Years of the 21st century in Russia
2010s in Russia
Russia
Russia
Russia